John Thomas O'Neil (born 7 June 1971 in Bellshill, North Lanarkshire) is a Scottish former professional association footballer. He represented Scotland once, and played for Dundee United, St Johnstone, Hibernian and Falkirk in the top division.

Career
O'Neil, a right-sided midfielder, began his career at Dundee United, where he progressed through the youth ranks. O'Neil scored for United after coming on as a substitute in their 1991 Scottish Cup final defeat against Motherwell, with his header reducing Motherwell's lead to 3–2. At the start of the 1994–95 season, he was signed by ex-United colleague Paul Sturrock for United's Tayside rivals St Johnstone. During his six years at McDiarmid Park, O'Neil became a regular. He played in nearly 200 league matches, over double his tally in the same time with United. In June 2000, O'Neil moved to Hibernian. It was during his spell with the Edinburgh club that O'Neil gained his only cap for Scotland, a start in a 1–1 draw against Poland in an away friendly on 25 April 2001. Ten years earlier, he won his sole under-21 cap.

After three years with Hibs, O'Neil joined Falkirk in 2003 and won a second Scottish First Division title in 2005 before joining Gretna in January 2006. O'Neil won a Second Division title and a third First Division title with The Borderers the following season, also collecting a third Scottish Cup runners-up medal in the defeat on penalties to Hearts. He left Gretna to join Cowdenbeath at the start of the 2007–08 season, signed by former Dundee United teammate Brian Welsh. He scored his first and only goal for Cowdenbeath in a Scottish League Cup loss at former club Gretna. O'Neil was released by Cowdenbeath in January 2009 and then signed for East Stirlingshire.

Honours

Dundee United
Scottish Cup runner-up: 1991
St Johnstone
Scottish First Division winner: 1996–97

Hibernian
Scottish Cup runner-up: 2001
Falkirk
Scottish First Division winner: 2004–05,
Scottish Challenge Cup winner: 2004–05
Gretna
Scottish Cup runner-up: 2006
Scottish First Division winner: 2006–07
Scottish Second Division winner: 2005–06

References

External links

1971 births
Living people
Footballers from Bellshill
Association football midfielders
Scottish footballers
Scotland international footballers
Dundee United F.C. players
St Johnstone F.C. players
Hibernian F.C. players
Falkirk F.C. players
Gretna F.C. players
Cowdenbeath F.C. players
East Stirlingshire F.C. players
Scottish Premier League players
Scottish Football League players
Scotland under-21 international footballers